David Daniell (born 23 December 1989 in Middlesbrough) is an English competitive cyclist, specialising in track sprinting. A member of the British Cycling Olympic Academy, he is a Junior World Team Sprint Champion for the second year running.

Daniell began cycling after being spotted at his school in British Cycling's Go-Ride scheme. He was nominated for BBC Young Sports Personality of the Year in 2006 and was awarded Junior Sport's Personality of the Year at the 11th annual Evening Gazette Sports Awards 2007.

His first victory in a World Cup event was in October 2008, when he beat Yevhen Bolibrukh of Ukraine. He took the victory in the kilo event with a time of 1:01.996, a clear margin of over a second over the rest of the field.

After winning a silver medal in the Keirin at the 2010 Commonwealth Games, Daniell underwent knee surgery that kept him out of training for 15 weeks. Subsequently, he badly twisted his leg while riding on the road in autumn 2012, resulting in him losing 40 percent of the cartilage in his joint. He was dropped from the British team before Christmas 2012 as he was not performing at the same level as before his injury.

In 2013, he moved from Middlesbrough to East Kilbride, taking up a part-time position as a coach at the Sir Chris Hoy Velodrome in Glasgow. He has said that he aimed to qualify for the English team at the 2014 Commonwealth Games in Glasgow, but that he hoped to represent Scotland at the 2018 Commonwealth Games as he will have been resident in the country long enough.

Palmarès

2005
British National Track Championships
2nd  Sprint (U16)
5th 500m TT (U16)

2006
UCI Junior Track World Championships
1st  Team Sprint (with Jason Kenny & Christian Lyte)
23rd 1km time trial
European Track Championships
1st  1km time trial, Junior
5th Team Sprint, Junior
British National Track Championships
2nd  3km Pursuit (Junior)
2nd  Keirin (Junior)
3rd  1km time trial (Junior)
7th Sprint (Junior)
17th Team Sprint (with Jason Kenny & Dave Le Grys)

2007
1st 1km time trial, 2008–2009 UCI Track World Cup, Round 1, Manchester
European Track Championships
1st  Sprint, Junior
2nd  Team Sprint, Junior
11th Keirin, Junior
British National Track Championships
1st  Sprint (Junior)
1st  1km time trial (Junior)
2nd  Keirin (Junior)
UCI Junior Track World Championships
2nd  Keirin
5th Kilo
8th Team Sprint

2009
2nd  Under-23 Team Sprint, European Track Championships
UCI Track Cycling World Cup
2nd 1km time trial
32nd Team Sprint
12th 1km time trial, UCI Track Cycling World Championships

2010
2nd  Keirin, Commonwealth Games
7th Kilo, UCI Track Cycling World Championships

2011
British National Track Championships
2nd  Keirin
2nd  Sprint
2nd  Team Sprint

References

English track cyclists
Cyclists from Yorkshire
Sportspeople from Middlesbrough
1989 births
Living people
Cyclists at the 2010 Commonwealth Games
Commonwealth Games medallists in cycling
Commonwealth Games silver medallists for England
English male cyclists
Medallists at the 2010 Commonwealth Games